Pyxidiophora is a genus of arthropod-associated fungi in the family Pyxidiophoraceae. It was circumscribed by mycologists Julius Oscar Brefeld and Franz von tavel in 1891. P. nyctalidis is the type species.

Species
Pyxidiophora arvernensis 
Pyxidiophora asterophora 
Pyxidiophora badiorostris 
Pyxidiophora bainemensis 
Pyxidiophora caulicola 
Pyxidiophora corallisetosa 
Pyxidiophora cuniculicola 
Pyxidiophora fusco-olivacea 
Pyxidiophora fusispora 
Pyxidiophora grovei 
Pyxidiophora kimbroughii 
Pyxidiophora lundqvistii 
Pyxidiophora marchalii 
Pyxidiophora microspora 
Pyxidiophora moseri 
Pyxidiophora nyctalidis 
Pyxidiophora petchii 
Pyxidiophora schotteriana 
Pyxidiophora spinuliformis 
Pyxidiophora spinulorostrata 
Pyxidiophora subbasalipunctata

References

Laboulbeniomycetes
Laboulbeniomycetes genera
Taxa described in 1891
Taxa named by Julius Oscar Brefeld